The Nieuwendijk is a major shopping street in central Amsterdam. There are some 200 shops along the street. The street, which dates to the early medieval history of Amsterdam, counts 98 buildings with  status.

The Nieuwendijk runs northeast from Dam Square, then turns left near Prins Hendrikkade. The Nieuwendijk is part of a medieval street pattern intersected by a multitude of narrow alleys. Nine alleys run between Nieuwendijk and Damrak, seven run between Nieuwendijk and Nieuwezijds Voorburgwal, and three further alleys run west and east from Nieuwendijk beyond Martelaarsgracht.

The  ("short Nieuwendijk"), the westernmost part between Martelaarsgracht and Singel, was pedestrianised in the 1970s. In 2013, the entire street was pedestrianised.

History

Middle Ages 
The Nieuwendijk is one of the oldest streets of Amsterdam. The Nieuwendijk ("new dyke") and Kalverstraat originally formed a dyke running through the western side of early medieval Amsterdam. The oldest traces of habitation in Amsterdam, dating to the late 12th century, were located on the Nieuwendijk and Oudekerksplein. Here, small farms were constructed on artificially constructed mounds, so-called .

The first non-agrarian buildings in Amsterdam were built on the Nieuwendijk. Archeological excavations on the grounds of the former Cinema Royal at Nieuwendijk 154 revealed a house dating to 1225, half a century before the first mention of the town in written records. Archeological excavations also revealed a small castle at the corner of Nieuwendijk and the alley Dirk van Hasseltsteeg, built around 1275. The fortification was torn down again around 1300. This was possibly related to the 1303-1304 occupation of Amsterdam by Jan van Amstel, following which Count Wiliam III of Holland ordered the town to demolish its defences.

Shortly after 1390, a number of buildings at the southern end of Nieuwendijk were cleared to create a square along the dam on the Amstel river called  ("The Place"), and a town hall was built there. This became Dam Square.

Modern history 
The Nieuwendijk was a major shopping street as early as the 17th century. Simon Goudsmit in 1870 opened a haberdashery shop at Nieuwendijk 132, which grew to become the present-day De Bijenkorf chain of department stores. Another successful retailer who started on the Nieuwendijk was Anton Sinkel, who opened a shop at Nieuwendijk 174-176 in 1821, which grew to a chain of stores around the country.  ("Sinkel's shop") has since become a Dutch expression for a shop selling a wide variety of goods. The brothers Ephraim and Levi Gerzon opened their first shop on Nieuwendijk in 1889, followed by a chain of stores around the country. Fashion designer Fong Leng opened her first shop on the Nieuwendijk in 1969. Entrepreneur  (owner of fashion retailer MS Mode) also opened his first shop on the Nieuwendijk. 

In the 1950s the Nieuwendijk became a centre of the  youth subculture. The term  was popularised by a 1955 article in Vrij Nederland magazine, "De nozems van de Nieuwendijk" ("The nozems of the Nieuwendijk").

Residents 
 Jacob Adriaensz Backer (1609 – 1651), painter
  (1833 – 1890), photographer
 Jacob J. Hinlopen (1582 – 1629), merchant
 Jan Jacobszoon Hinlopen (1626 – 1666), merchant
 Thijmen Jacobsz Hinlopen (1537 – 1637), merchant
 Cornelis Hooft (1547 – 1627), mayor and merchant
 Walewijn van der Veen (1617-1669), merchant, attorney and New Amsterdam notary

Gallery

References 

Streets in Amsterdam
Shopping districts and streets in the Netherlands
Pedestrian streets in the Netherlands